The 2009 Copa del Rey Juvenil was the 59th staging of the tournament. The competition began on 17 May and ended on 27 June with the final.

First round

|}

Quarterfinals

|}

Semifinals

|}

Final

See also
2008–09 División de Honor Juvenil de Fútbol

External links
 Historical Spanish Juvenile Competition Results

Copa del Rey Juvenil de Fútbol
Juvenil